D.E.A. is an American drama series which was aired on Fox as part of its 1990-91 lineup.

D.E.A. was based on true stories of the Drug Enforcement Administration.  Shot in cinéma vérité style, the program combined recreated scenes using actors with actual surveillance footage and film of actual newscasts covering the stories depicted.

Fox apparently had considerable confidence in this concept.  When the initial version garnered low ratings and was put on hiatus, before its return the program was retooled into DEA—Special Task Force, which placed more emphasis on the agents' personal lives and showed less graphic violence.  The revamped show premiered in April 1991, but also failed to achieve significant ratings and the program was canceled for good in June 1991.

Cast
Jenna Gago as Teresa Robles 
Tom Mason as Bill Stadler 
Miguel Sandoval as Rafael Cordera
Alan Scarfe as Schliemann
Byron Keith Minns as Jimmy Sanders
Christopher Stanley as Nick Biaggi
David Wohl as Phil Jacobs

Episodes

Production 
The original concept of the show came from showrunner/creator Richard DiLello, who claimed that he'll create a hybrid format for the show that will combine elements of documentary (including newsreel footage and interviews) with drama.

The project was soon pitched to Lorimar Television, which was in turn pitched to the fast-growing Fox Broadcasting Company.

On May 14, 1990, the Fox Broadcasting Company announced that they would pick up the series for the new Friday night schedule, alongside reality program America's Most Wanted, which was shown at 8:00-9:00pm.

Reception 
The show received mostly positive reviews by critics. The San Francisco Examiner called the show "the biggest breakthrough of the new season."

See also
 1990 in television

References

 Brooks, Tim and Marsh, Earle, The Complete Directory to Prime Time Network and Cable TV Shows 1946–Present

External links

1990s American drama television series
Television series by Warner Bros. Television Studios
1990 American television series debuts
1991 American television series endings
Drug Enforcement Administration in fiction
English-language television shows
Fox Broadcasting Company original programming
Television shows set in New York City